Skorupski (feminine Skorupska) is a Polish surname. Notable people include:

 Jan Stanisław Skorupski (born 1938), Polish essayist
 John Skorupski (born 1946), British philosopher
 Krzysztof Skorupski (born 1989), Polish rallycross driver
 Łukasz Skorupski (born 1991), Polish footballer
 Ute Skorupski (born 1959), East German rower
Nina Skorupska, British engineer

Polish-language surnames